La Junta Airport ,  is an airport serving La Junta (es), a small town in the Aysén Region of Chile.

It is at the conjunction of several mountain valleys, and there is nearby mountainous terrain to the east, and distant mountainous terrain in all quadrants.

See also

Transport in Chile
List of airports in Chile

References

External links
OpenStreetMap - La Junta
OurAirports - La Junta
SkyVector - La Junta

Airports in Aysén Region